Clarence Reid may refer to:

 Blowfly (musician) (Clarence Henry Reid, 1939–2016), American musician, songwriter and producer
 Clarence A. Reid (1892–1978), lieutenant governor of Michigan